Mohamed El-Sayed (born 20 June 1924) was an Egyptian rower who competed at the 1948 and 1952 Summer Olympics.

References

External links
  

1924 births
Possibly living people
Egyptian male rowers
Olympic rowers of Egypt
Rowers at the 1948 Summer Olympics
Rowers at the 1952 Summer Olympics
Place of birth missing